Nellim ( or ;) is a village on the shore of Lake Inari in Inari, Finland that has three distinctly different cultures: Finns, the Inari Sámi and the Skolt Sámi. The village has a store, a coffeeshop, a marina, an Orthodox  wilderness church and a wilderness hotel. Other landmarks in the area include an old log flume, the Travelers' Cross at Tsarmijärvi, and remnants of the Rautaportti "Iron Gate" fortifications that were constructed in the second world war. The people of Nellim claim that it is the best location in Finland to view the Northern Lights.

Livelihood
The main sources of livelihood in Nellim are reindeer husbandry, natural economy and tourism.

Villages in Inari, Finland